This is a list of buildings and other structures that have been envisioned.

Proposed structures

The definition of 'vision' is that used by the Council on Tall Buildings and Urban Habitat. The list does not include under construction buildings as these are listed at list of future tallest buildings.

Structures

Cancelled projects

See also
 List of buildings with 100 floors or more
 List of cities with the most skyscrapers
 List of tallest buildings and structures
 Unfinished building

Notes

References

Visionary tall buildings